Club de Fútbol Sala Jumilla is a futsal club based in Jumilla, city of the autonomous community of Region of Murcia.

The club was established in 1997 and play home matches at Pabellón Carlos García Ruiz with capacity of 1,000  seaters.

History
The team played in regional divisions until 2004 when was promoted to División de Plata, achieving the promotion to Primera División in 2013.

Sponsors
Tapizados Roster - (1997–2008)
Central Quesera Montesinos - (2008–)

Season to season

4 seasons in Primera División
7 seasons in Segunda División
5 seasons in Segunda División B
2 seasons in Tercera División

Current squad 2013/14

External links
Official Website
Profile at LNFS.es

Futsal clubs in Spain
Sports teams in the Region of Murcia
Futsal clubs established in 1997
1997 establishments in Spain